This is a List of notable residents or former residents of the greater Ashfield area in Australia, covering the suburbs of the Municipality of Ashfield in Inner West of Sydney, including Ashfield, Croydon, Haberfield, and Summer Hill.

Arts

 James Muir Auld (1879–1942): Ashfield born artist; winner of the 1935 Wynne Prize
 Normand Henry Baker (1908–1955): Archibald Prize winning artist who was born in Summer Hill
 Geraldine Brooks (born 1955): Pulitzer Prize-winning author (for March); wrote about her childhood in Ashfield in the book Foreign Correspondence
 Henry Halloran (1811–1893): Poet and resident of Ashfield; buried in St John's cemetery
 John Lang (1816–1864): poet and barrister, son of Elizabeth Underwood; grew up in Ashfield
 Robert McAnally (1882-1956) Australian composer and conductor
 Adam Phillips (born 1971): Award-winning animator and artist who utilizes Adobe Flash; worked with Disney during the 1990s
 Robie Porter (Rob EG) (born 1942) musician and record label owner
 Arthur Streeton (1867–1943): Australian artist who briefly lived in Summer Hill
 Rod Taylor (1930-2015) Hollywood movie star
 P. L. Travers (1899–1996): Author of five volumes of Mary Poppins stories; boarded at Normanhurst School in Ashfield beginning in 1912 and later lived with her mother and younger sisters at 17 Pembroke Street
 Fredrick Wills (1870–1955), artist and photographer and motion picture pioneer

Business

 Adolphus Herbert Frederick Norman Appleroth (1886–1952), founder of Aeroplane Jelly
 Joseph Grace (1859–1931), founder of Grace Brothers department stores; lived at Yasmar in Haberfield
 John Goodlet (1835–1914): timber merchant and philanthropist who established the Goodlet Institute in Ashfield
 Anthony Hordern (1819–1876): Shopping magnate who built and lived at Shubra Hall, now part of the Presbyterian Ladies' College, Sydney in Croydon
 Richard Stanton (1862–1943): Developer of Haberfield who also lived there for many years
 Mei Quong Tart (1850–1903): Prominent Sydney businessman, tea house owner and acting consul to Imperial Chinese government in late 19th century; lived in Gallop House at 48 Arthur Street

Law
 Norman Allan (1901–1977): NSW police commissioner in 1962–72; was a resident of Haberfield
 Justice Greg James (born 1944): Former NSW Supreme Court Judge, current president of Mental Health Review Tribunal of New South Wales and resident of Summer Hill
 Ian Temby, KC (born 1942): First Commissioner of the Independent Commission Against Corruption of New South Wales; former resident of Summer Hill
 Rt Hon Sir Cyril Walsh (1909–1973): Justice of the High Court of Australia and resident of Summer Hill

Military
 Colonel Matron Kathleen Best (1910–1957): Nurse and first director of the Women's Royal Australian Army Corps
 Pat Hughes (1917–1940), air force officer who shot down more German planes during the Battle of Britain than any other Australian
 John Paton (1834–1914), Scottish-born soldier awarded the Victoria Cross for gallantry at the Siege of Lucknow in India. He retired to Summer Hill and a park on the corner of Smith and Henson Streets in Summer Hill is named after him.
 Major General Gustave Ramaciotti (1862–1927): Owned the Theatre Royal property by the corners of King and Castlereagh Streets; base commander during World War 1, from 1915 to 1917; retired in 1917 and was appointed C.M.G.
 Alick James Bryant (1903–1985) also known as James John Bryant:  Believed to have been the youngest Australian soldier to serve during the First World War

Pioneers
 Augustus Alt (1731–1815): First surveyor-general of New South Wales; arrived with the First Fleet in 1788 and was granted a substantial parcel of land in northern Ashfield
 Robert Campbell (1769–1846): Early settler responsible for giving Ashfield its name
 David Ramsay (1794–1860): medical practitioner and merchant
 Elizabeth Underwood (ca. 1794–1858): Early landowner of Ashfield Park estate who subdivided it to form the village of Ashfield in 1838

Politics

 Joseph Abbott (New South Wales politician) (1843–1903), wool-broker and politician
 Michael Fitzpatrick (Australian politician) (1816–1881), public servant, land agent and politician
 Mark Hammond (1844–1908): gold miner, mayor of Ashfield and member of the NSW Parliament
 Ninian Melville (1843–1897): a well-known Sydney furniture maker and mortician who subsequently became the Mayor of Ashfield, and a parliamentarian
 Richard Murden (1906-1997): Haberfield furniture salesman, twice elected mayor of Ashfield and also elected to the NSW Parliament.
 Sir Henry Parkes (1815–1896): Former NSW Premier, lived in Ashfield during the 1870s
 Herbert Pratten (1865–1928): Jam maker and politician, was mayor of Ashfield and later Federal Minister for Trade and Customs from 1923 to 1928; Pratten Park named in his honour
 Murray Robson (1906-1974): soldier awarded the DSO in WWII and NSW opposition leader from 1954 to 1955. His father, William Robson (1869-1951), was also a member of parliament and mayor of Ashfield.
 Sir Bertram Stevens (1889–1973): premier of New South Wales from 1932 to 1939
 Paul Whelan (born 1943): Mayor of Ashfield from 1972 to 1976 and Minister for Police in the Carr government from 1995 to 2001.
Also see List of mayors at the end of the page.

Science

 Richard Baker (1854–1941): Curator/Director of the Technological Museum in Ultimo (now known as the Powerhouse Museum); lived in Ashfield for 30 years in a house named "Eudesmia", which still stands; proponent of decorative use of the Waratah in logos and symbols
 Dr John Belisario (1820–1900): Dentist at the later end of the 19th century; recorded as living in Summer Hill in the 1891 census; first dentist in Australia to administer ether to a patient to carry out dental work
 Professor Edgeworth David (1858–1934): noted geologist and Antarctic explorer
 Walter Wilson Froggatt (1858–1937), entomologist, founder of the Naturalists' Society of New South Wales and author; Froggatt Crescent in Croydon, and the Froggatt prize for Science at the Presbyterian Ladies' College, Sydney are named after him
 Ian Clunies Ross (1899–1959): Veterinary scientist and founder of the CSIRO, he was for a while commemorated on the Australian $50 note

Sport

 Daphne Akhurst (1903–1933): Five times Australian Open tennis champion; educated at Normanhurst School in Ashfield and Sydney Conservatorium of Music
 Kevin Berry (1945–2006): Swimmer who won gold in the 200m butterfly at the 1964 Summer Olympics; resident of Summer Hill
 Stan Rowley (1876–1924): Australian Olympic athlete who won three individual bronze medals (60m, 100m, 200m) at the Paris Olympics in 1900 and also picked up a gold medal as part of the British cross-country team

Other
 Margaret Chandler (1934–1963), one of the two victims who died under mysterious circumstances in the well-publicised  Bogle-Chandler case; lived in Croydon with her husband Geoffrey
 Reverend Bill Crews (born 1944): As the Minister of Ashfield Uniting Church, he created the Exodus Foundation to assist homeless and abandoned youth
 David Elphinstone (1847–1916): prominent architect and builder and resident of Summer Hill
 Edwin Johnson (1835–1894): Education reformer, undersecretary to the Department of Public Instruction
 Bea Miles (1902–1973): Eccentric Sydneysider, born in Ashfield but spent much of her later life living on the street and whose life was the inspiration for the book and movie, Lilian's Story
 Louise Taplin (1855–1901): Matron, until her death, of The Infants Home in Ashfield; led the home through the 1890s depression
 Evelyn Tildesley (1882–1976): School teacher, principal of Normanhurst School from 1913 to 1925, when she was appointed acting principal of The Women's College at the University of Sydney. Awarded MBE in 1950

Mayors of Ashfield

References

 
Ashfield, New South Wales